McClelland Ridge is a high rock ridge between Sanford Valley and Thomas Valley in the eastern part of the Olympus Range, Victoria Land, Antarctica. It was named by the Advisory Committee on Antarctic Names in 1997 after topographic engineer Elias E. McClelland, leader of the 1971–72 United States Geological Survey (USGS) field party that established a network of horizontal and vertical control over a 6,000 square kilometer area of the McMurdo Dry Valleys to support compilation of eight topographic maps at 1:50,000 scale. These maps, bounded by 160°E and 164°E and 77°15′S and 77°45′S, were published by the USGS in 1977.

References

Ridges of Victoria Land
McMurdo Dry Valleys